The 1st Cavalry Division "Eugenio di Savoia" was a cavalry or "Celere" (Fast) division of the Royal Italian Army during World War II. The division was mobilized in 1940 and took part in the Invasion of Yugoslavia. The division was assigned to the XI Corps in Ljubljana and remained in Yugoslavia as occupation force on the Dalmatian coast. After the Armistice of Cassibile on 8 September 1943 the division was disbanded by the Germans.

History 
The division was formed on 17 April 1930 as 1st Fast Division in the city of Udine in Friuli. Although not officially sanctioned the division is considered to be the heir of the 1st Cavalry Division of Friuli, which fought in World War I and consisted of the I and II cavalry brigades and was based in Udine. On 15 June 1930 the I Cavalry Brigade, with the regiments Regiment "Cavalleggeri di Saluzzo" (12th), Regiment "Cavalleggeri di Monferrato" (13th), and Regiment "Cavalleggeri di Alessandria" (14th) entered the division. The following year the 1st Light Artillery Regiment was raised and assigned to the division.

In January 1933 the Regiment "Piemonte Reale Cavalleria" (2nd) replaced the Regiment "Cavalleggeri di Monferrato" (13th). On 1 January 1934 the division and brigade received the name "Eugenio di Savoia". On the same date the brigade was reorganized with the Regiment "Cavalleggeri di Alessandria" (14th) being replaced by the 11th Bersaglieri Regiment, and the I Light Tank Group "San Giusto" joining the brigade.

On 1 February 1938 the I Cavalry Brigade "Eugenio di Savoia" was dissolved and its three regiments came under direct command of the division. In October of the same year the Regiment "Cavalleggeri di Alessandria" (14th) returned to the division, which in turn lost the Regiment "Piemonte Reale Cavalleria" (2nd).

World War II 
On 30 March 1941 the division ceded its 1st Fast Artillery Regiment with the II and III motorized groups to the 27th Infantry Division "Brescia", which was fighting in the Western Desert Campaign. On 3 April the Regiment "Nizza Cavalleria" (1st) was attached to the division for the upcoming Invasion of Yugoslavia. Afterwards the division remained in Yugoslavia as occupation force. On 23 June the division lost its last artillery group, which was transferred to the 3rd Cavalry Division "Principe Amedeo Duca d'Aosta" to form an artillery regiment for the latter division's upcoming deployment to the Eastern front.

On 17 October 1941 the Regiment "Cavalleggeri di Alessandria" (14th) conducted the last cavalry charge by an Italian military unit: encircled by a group of Yugoslav Partisans near Poloj in Croatia the regiment launched repeated nighttime saber charges against the partisans and despite suffering heavy casualties, the charge succeeded and the regiment broke through the encirclement.

After the Armistice of Cassibile was announced on 8 September 1943 the division tried to rally in Rijeka, but by 13 September 1943 it was dissolved by invading German forces and ceased to exist.

Organization
The division had undergone a level of mechanization and fielded two cavalry regiments, a Bersaglieri regiment, a motorized artillery regiment, and a light tank group. The squadrons of the cavalry regiments were horse-mounted and, other than a motorcycle company, the Bersaglieri were issued with bicycles. The light tank group had a total of 61 L3/35s and L6/40 tanks.

  1st Cavalry Division "Eugenio di Savoia", in Udine
 Regiment "Cavalleggeri di Saluzzo" (12th), in Pordenone
 Command Squadron
 I Squadrons Group
 II Squadrons Group
 5th Machine Gun Squadron
 Regiment "Cavalleggeri di Alessandria" (14th), in Palmanova
 Command Squadron
 I Squadrons Group
 II Squadrons Group
 5th Machine Gun Squadron
 11th Bersaglieri Regiment, in Gradisca d'Isonzo (attached to the 158th Infantry Division "Zara" in 1943)
 Command Company
 XV Bersaglieri Battalion
 XXVII Bersaglieri Battalion
 XXXIII Bersaglieri Battalion
 11th Bersaglieri Motorcyclists Company
 11th Anti-tank Company (47/32 anti-tank guns)
 1st Fast Artillery Regiment "Eugenio di Savoia", in Udine (transferred to the 27th Infantry Division "Brescia" on 30 March 1941)
 Command Unit
 I Group (75/27 Mod. 12 horse-drawn guns)
 II Motorized Group (75/27 Mod. 12 guns)
 III Motorized Group (75/27 Mod. 12 guns)
 2x Anti-aircraft batteries (20/65 Mod. 35 anti-aircraft guns)
 Ammunition and Supply Unit
 I Light Tank Group "San Giusto", in Codroipo (L3/33 and L6/40 tanks)
 171st Anti-tank Company (47/32 anti-tank guns; transferred to the 52nd Infantry Division "Torino" for the deployment in the Soviet Union)
 101st Mixed Engineer Company
 71st Medical Section
 57th Field Hospital
 58th Field Hospital
 59th Field Hospital
 10th Surgical Unit
 211th Transport Section
 34th Transport Platoon
 53rd Transport Platoon
 852nd Transport Platoon
 854th Transport Platoon
 91st Supply Section
 1st Transport Unit
 172nd Carabinieri Section
 18th Field Post Office

Attached during the Invasion of Yugoslavia in 1941:
 Regiment "Nizza Cavalleria" (1st)
 Command Squadron
 I Squadrons Group
 II Squadrons Group
 5th Machine Gun Squadron

Military honors 
For its conduct while serving with the 27th Infantry Division "Brescia" during the Western Desert campaign the President of Italy awarded on 7 December 1951 to the division's 1st Cavalry Artillery Regiment Italy's highest military honor, the Gold Medal of Military Valour.

  1st Cavalry Artillery Regiment on 7 December 1951

Commanding officers 
The division's commanding officers were:

 Generale di Divisione Ettore Bastico (January 1932 - September 1933)
 Generale di Divisione Augusto de Pignier (September 1933 - 15 September 1934)
 Generale di Divisione Riccardo Moizo (16 September 1934 - 30 September 1935)
 Generale di Divisione Mario Caracciolo di Feroleto (1 October 1935 - 12 December 1936)
 Generale di Divisione Emilio Gamerra (13 December 1936 - 15 March 1938)
 Generale di Brigata Nino Sozzani (acting, 16 March - 20 August 1940)
 Generale di Divisione Federico Ferrari Orsi (5 October 1938 - 15 November 1940)
 Generale di Brigata Giuseppe Lombard (acting, 16-19 November 1940)
 Generale di Divisione Cesare Lomaglio (20 November 1940 - 9 September 1943)

References

Further reading
 Dr Jeffrey T. Fowler – Axis Cavalry in World War II
 George F. Nafziger – Italian Order of Battle: An organizational history of the Italian Army in World War II (3 vol)
 Divisione celere alla data di  10 giugno 1940. (PL) .

Divisions of Italy in World War II
Cavalry divisions of Italy
Military units and formations established in 1940
Military units and formations disestablished in 1943
Military units and formations of Italy in Yugoslavia in World War II